The following highways are numbered 218:

Canada
 Manitoba Provincial Road 218
 New Brunswick Route 218
 Prince Edward Island Route 218
 Quebec Route 218

China
 China National Highway 218

Costa Rica
 National Route 218

Japan
 Japan National Route 218

United States
 U.S. Route 218
 Arkansas Highway 218
 California State Route 218
 Connecticut Route 218
 Florida State Road 218 (former)
 Georgia State Route 218 (former)
 K-218 (Kansas highway)
 Kentucky Route 218
 Maine State Route 218
 Maryland Route 218
 M-218 (Michigan highway) (former)
 Minnesota State Highway 218
 Montana Secondary Highway 218
 New Mexico State Road 218
 New York State Route 218
 North Carolina Highway 218
 Ohio State Route 218
 Oregon Route 218
 Pennsylvania Route 218
 South Dakota Highway 218 (former)
 Tennessee State Route 218
 Texas State Highway 218
 Texas State Highway Loop 218
 Utah State Route 218
 Virginia State Route 218
 West Virginia Route 218
 Wyoming Highway 218